Seven Year Itch is the fifteenth studio album by Etta James, released in 1988 by Island Records. The title of the album refers to her comeback after approximately seven years without a major recording contract. The album was described as "the first in her career to consistently capture the magic of James at her live best," while "her voice stretches out with more sureness and authority than ever."

Track listing

Personnel
Etta James - vocals
Bob Wray, James "Hutch" Hutchinson, Willie Weeks – bass
Ricky Fataar, Roger Hawkins – drums
Kenny Greenberg, Reggie Young, Steve Cropper – guitar
Art Neville, Barry Beckett – keyboards
Jim Horn - saxophone, horn arrangements
Jack Hale, Mike Haynes, Quitman Dennis - horns
Technical
Barry Beckett (tracks: 4, 6, 8), Scott Hendricks – mixing
Barry Beckett, Ricky Fataar (tracks: 4, 6, 8), Rob Fraboni (tracks: 4, 6, 8) – producer
Howard Steele, Rich Schirmer, Scott Hendricks - recording

References

1988 albums
Etta James albums
Albums produced by Barry Beckett
Albums produced by Ricky Fataar
Albums produced by Rob Fraboni
Island Records albums